VTL may refer to:

 Virtual tape library, for computer data storage
 Vermont Transit Lines, US
 Vertical turret lathe
 Apache Velocity Template Language